Alexandros Yenovelis (born 26 February 1968) is a retired Greek sprinter who specialized in the 100 metres.

He competed in relay at the 1996 Olympic Games and the World Championships in 1993, 1995 and 1997, and in the individual distance at the 1993 and 1995 World Indoor Championships, without reaching the final.

His personal best time was 10.15 seconds, achieved in May 1996 in Rethimno. This ranks him fourth among Greek 100 metres sprinters, behind Angelos Pavlakakis, Aristotelis Gavelas and Christoforos Choidis.

Honours

References 
 

1968 births
Living people
Greek male sprinters
Athletes (track and field) at the 1996 Summer Olympics
Olympic athletes of Greece
Mediterranean Games silver medalists for Greece
Athletes (track and field) at the 1993 Mediterranean Games
Mediterranean Games medalists in athletics
20th-century Greek people